Nick Dowling is the founder and president of IDS International. He focuses on stability operations and interagency coordination in both the public and private sectors.

Early life and education 
Dowling has a Bachelor’s from Harvard University and a Master’s in National Security Studies from the Georgetown University School of Foreign Service.

Career 
He was Director for European Affairs at the National Security Council (NSC) where he coordinated Bosnia and Kosovo policy to help bring and end to the Balkan wars. Prior to that, he was a defense fellow in the Office of the Secretary of Defense, a senior fellow at the National Defense University and a policy advisor for two presidential campaigns and a U.S. Senate campaign.

Dowling is the acting president of IDS International, a "smart power" national security firm that trains the US Army and Marines in sophisticated operations. He leads an IDS team with a vast array of stability operations, interagency, reconstruction and regional expertise.

After founding IDS International in 2001, Dowling helped the company become a provider in training on interagency coordination in conflict zones that included Iraq and Afghanistan.

He is also a lifetime member of the Council on Foreign Relations.

References

Living people
Year of birth missing (living people)
Harvard University alumni
Walsh School of Foreign Service alumni
United States National Security Council staffers